Gary C. Bagby (born August 20, 1979), who goes by the stage name Foreknown and formerly Foreknown Apostolic, is an American Christian hip hop rapper. He started making hip hop music in 2009, with his first studio album, Ornithology, releasing in 2014 from Humble Beast Records.

Early life
Gary C. Bagby was born on August 20, 1979, and raised in Alhambra, California by his parents, where he graduated from Alhambra High School in 1998. He is an avid Star Wars fanatic.

Music career
His hip hop music recording career began in 2009, while his first studio album, Ornithology, was released on August 12, 2014, by Humble Beast Records.

Personal life
He resides in Peoria, Arizona, with his wife and children.

Discography
Studio albums
 Ornithology (August 12, 2014, Humble Beast)

References

External links
 

1979 births
Living people
Musicians from Arizona
American performers of Christian hip hop music
Rappers from California
Rappers from Arizona
21st-century American rappers
West Coast hip hop musicians